Irene Monaco (born 7 October 1940) is a former Italian a paralympic multi-sport athlete who won ten medals at the Summer Paralympics from 1964 to 1984.

Married to paralympic athlete Uber Sala who competed at the 1968 Summer Paralympics in Dartchery. She has a twin sister Elena, who also has polio. who won six medals at the Summer Paralympics between Tokyo 1964 and Tel Aviv 1968.

Career
Irene Monaco continued to compete in archery in the masters category until almost 50 years, winning some national and world titles.

See also
 Italian multiple medallists at the Summer Paralympics

References

External links
 Irene Monaco at CONI

1940 births
Living people
Paralympic wheelchair fencers of Italy
Paralympic gold medalists for Italy
Paralympic silver medalists for Italy
Paralympic bronze medalists for Italy
Paralympic medalists in wheelchair fencing
Archers at the 1980 Summer Paralympics
Archers at the 1984 Summer Paralympics
Athletes (track and field) at the 1964 Summer Paralympics
Athletes (track and field) at the 1968 Summer Paralympics
Table tennis players at the 1968 Summer Paralympics
Wheelchair fencers at the 1964 Summer Paralympics
Wheelchair fencers at the 1968 Summer Paralympics
Wheelchair fencers at the 1980 Summer Paralympics
Sportspeople from the Province of Pisa
Medalists at the 1964 Summer Paralympics
Medalists at the 1968 Summer Paralympics
Medalists at the 1980 Summer Paralympics
Sportspeople from Rome
Italian masters athletes